Isadore or Irving  Friedman (died January 28, 1939), also known under the alias Danny Field, was a New York mobster and an associate of labor racketeer Louis "Lepke" Buchalter. He later agreed to testify against Buchalter on behalf of District Attorney Thomas E. Dewey as one of several high-profile witnesses scheduled to testify against Buchalter; however, he was murdered with Louis Cohen on January 28, 1939, shortly before his court appearance. Jacob "Kuppy" Midgen was believed to be the killer.

References

Further reading
Fried, Albert. The Rise and Fall of the Jewish Gangster in America. New York: Holt, Rinehart and Winston, 1980. 

Kavieff, Paul R. The Life and Times of Lepke Buchalter: America's Most Ruthless Labor Racketeer, 2006. 

Year of birth missing
1939 deaths
People murdered by Murder, Inc.
Murdered Jewish American gangsters
People murdered in New York City
Male murder victims
Deaths by firearm in Manhattan